The phrase Ali brothers, in Indian history, refers to the two brothers:
Shaukat Ali (politician) (1873–1938)
Mohammad Ali Jauhar (1878–1931)